Washington Kurdish Institute is an educational and research organization focused on Kurds. It was established in Washington DC in September 1996 by Dr. Najmaldin Karim, Its objectives are raising awareness of Kurdish issues, promoting human rights in Kurdish areas and supporting development of civil society among Kurds. The institute has a Board of Directors headed by Dr. Najmaldin Karim. It also has an advisory committee composed of renowned Kurdologists such as Martin van Bruinessen, Abbas Vali, Amir Hassanpour and Michael Chyet. The institute offers Kurdish language courses at beginner and advanced levels for both dialects of Sorani and Kurmanji.

Martin van Bruinessen said in 2000 that the Washington Kurdish Institute was "playing an important role in political lobbying on behalf of the Kurds".

References

Kurdish organisations